The 1985–86 Algerian Championnat National was the 24th season of the Algerian Championnat National since its establishment in 1962. A total of 20 teams contested the league, with JE Tizi-Ouzou as the defending champions.

Team summaries

Promotion and relegation 
Teams promoted from Algerian Division 2 1985-1986 
 MP Alger
 CM Constantine
 MC Saïda

Teams relegated to Algerian Division 2 1986-1987
 MA Hussein Dey
 ESM Bel-Abbès
 JH Djazaïr

League table

References

External links
1985–86 Algerian Championnat National

Algerian Championnat National
Championnat National
Algerian Ligue Professionnelle 1 seasons